The Spain national U-16 basketball team (Spain Kids national basketball team), is the representative for Spain in international basketball competitions, and it is organized and run by the Spanish Basketball Federation. The Spain national U-16 basketball team represents Spain at the FIBA Europe Under-16 Championship.

They won their 5th title at the 2019 FIBA U16 European Championship.

FIBA Europe Under-16 Championship

References

See also
Spanish Basketball Federation
Spain national youth basketball teams
Spain women's national under-17 basketball team

Men's national under-16 basketball teams
Basketball